Out of Water is the 17th studio album by Peter Hammill, originally released on Enigma Records in 1990 and subsequently re-released on Hammill's own Fie! label. Hammill himself considers this album to be a turning point from his mid-eighties style.

Two of the performers are credited by the nicknames they were given when they were part of Hammill's K Group in the 1980s: John Ellis (who also painted the picture on the cover) as "Fury" and Nic Potter as "Mozart". The song "A Way Out" is believed to be about the suicide of Hammill's brother.

"Our Oyster" references the 1989 Tiananmen square massacare.

Track listing
All songs written by Peter Hammill.
"Evidently Goldfish" – 5:02
"Not the Man" – 4:24
"No Moon in the Water" – 4:36
"Our Oyster" – 5:33
"Something about Ysabel's Dance" – 5:32
"Green Fingers" – 4:35
"On the Surface" – 8:14
"A Way Out" – 7:17

Personnel 

Peter Hammill – vocals, guitar, keyboards
Stuart Gordon – violin on 5
John Ellis – guitar on 1, 4, and 7
David Jackson – saxophone on 3 and 6
Nic Potter – bass on 3 and 6

Technical
Peter Hammill - recording engineer, mixing (Sofa Sound/Terra Incognita, Bath)
David Lord - recording engineer, mixing (Crescent Studios, Bath)
John Ellis - cover drawing

"Thanks to Gail, Norma and Louise; David, Eda and Gaynor; Neil Perry; Coach; Paul Ridout; Hilary, Holly, Beatrice and Phoebe, Mozart, Jackson, SG and Fury."

References

External links 
Peter Hammill's notes on the album

Peter Hammill albums
1990 albums
Enigma Records albums